Thomas Morris may refer to:

Entertainment
 Thomas Morris (musician) (1897–1945), jazz cornetist
 Thomas Baden Morris (1900s–1986), playwright

Politics
 Thomas Morris (New York politician) (1771–1849), U.S. Representative from New York
 Thomas Morris (Ohio politician) (1776–1844), Senator from Ohio
 Thomas Owen Morris (1845–1924), American mayor of Nashville, Tennessee
 Thomas Morris (Wisconsin politician) (1861–1928), Lieutenant Governor of Wisconsin, 1911–1915
 Thomas G. Morris (1919–2016), U.S. congressman from New Mexico
 Thomas R. Morris (born 1944), Virginia Secretary of Education, university president
 Thomas Richard Morris, British Conservative politician and magistrate who served as Mayor of St Pancras 1961–62

Religion and philosophy
 Thomas Asbury Morris (1794–1874), American bishop of the Methodist Episcopal Church and newspaper editor
 Thomas Morris (bishop) (1914–1997), Irish prelate of the Catholic Church
 Thomas V. Morris (born 1952), American philosopher and director of the Morris Institute of Human Values

Other
 Thomas Morris (British Army officer) (1732–1818), British Army officer and writer
 Thomas A. Morris (1811–1904), American General in the Union army, railroad executive and civil engineer
 Thomas Morris (engineer) (died 1832), English architect and engineer
 Thomas John Morris (1837–1912), U.S. federal judge
 Thomas Charles Morris, Welsh trade unionist and political activist
 Thomas Morris (American football) (1938–2010), American football player and coach

See also
 Tom Morris (disambiguation)
 Thomas Maurice, Oriental scholar and historian